The  Sacramento Mountain Lions season is the fourth season for the United Football League franchise.

Offseason
In July, the Sacramento Mountain Lions were known to be considering a move to Raley Field, a baseball park in West Sacramento, California. The Mountain Lions, 2011's attendance leader, played their previous two seasons at Hornet Stadium in Sacramento. At a press conference at Raley Field on August 6, the move to West Sacramento was confirmed. Two games were played there before the league folded.

Dennis Green, who had coached the Mountain Lions since 2009, when they were the California Redwoods, did not return as head coach in 2012. On August 6, Turk Schonert was announced as the new head coach.

Personnel

Staff

Roster

Schedule

Standings

References

Sacramento Mountain Lions seasons
Sacramento Mountain Lions
Sacramento Mountain Lions